Paulette Cruz (born January 8, 1989 in Colima, Colima) is a beach volleyball player from Mexico, who played during the Qualification Tournament of the Swatch FIVB World Tour 2006, playing with Wendy Guizar; they finished 41st.

She played at the 2009 NORCECA Caymand Islands Tournament with Vanessa Virgen, winning the silver medal, and later the bronze at the Boca Chica Tournament, in the Dominican Republic.

References

External links
 
 

1989 births
Living people
Mexican beach volleyball players
Sportspeople from Colima

Women's beach volleyball players